Charles 'Chas' Guldemond (born April 22, 1987) is an American snowboarder.

Personal life
Originally from Laconia, New Hampshire, Guldemond now resides in Truckee, California.

Career
Guldemond competes on the TTR World Tour. In the 2007/2008 Swatch TTR World Snowboard Tour, Guldemond finished ranked World No.7. He has a sponsorship deal with DC Snowboards,  His other sponsors include Rockstar Energy Drink, Electric, Under Armour, Hatch, Porters Tahoe, NEFF, Northstar, and Kicker.

Competition highlights
Swatch TTR 2008/2009 Season
 3rd – Slopestyle – 5Star Burton New Zealand Open (Ticket to Ride (World Snowboard Tour))
 5th – Halfpipe – 5Star Burton Australian Open  (Ticket to Ride (World Snowboard Tour))
 3rd – Big Air – 6Star Nissan X-Trail Jam (Ticket to Ride (World Snowboard Tour))
 4th – Slopestyle – 6Star O'Neill Evolution (Ticket to Ride (World Snowboard Tour))
 4th – Slopestyle- 6Star Burton European Open (Ticket to Ride (World Snowboard Tour))
 4th – Slopestyle – 5Star Burton Canadian Open (Ticket to Ride (World Snowboard Tour))
 4th – Halfpipe – 5Star Burton Canadian Open (Ticket to Ride (World Snowboard Tour))
 1st – Slopestyle – 5Star Nissan X-Trail Asian Open (Ticket to Ride (World Snowboard Tour))
 1st – Halfpipe – 5Star Nissan X-Trail Asian Open (Ticket to Ride (World Snowboard Tour))

References

External links
 
 
 
 
 

1987 births
Living people
American male snowboarders
X Games athletes
People from Truckee, California
People from Laconia, New Hampshire
Snowboarders at the 2014 Winter Olympics
Olympic snowboarders of the United States
Sportspeople from New Hampshire
20th-century American people
21st-century American people